Ingria is a historical region in what is now northwestern European Russia. 

Ingria may also refer to:

 Ingria, Piedmont, comune in the Metropolitan City of Turin in the Italian region Piedmont
 North Ingria, a short-lived, small state for the Ingrian Finns, which seceded from Bolshevist Russia after the October Revolution
 Swedish Ingria, a dominion of the Swedish Empire

See also
Ingrian (disambiguation)
Izhora (disambiguation)